Hampton/Winston-Salem '97 is a 7-CD live box set album from the American jam band Phish, recorded live at the Hampton Coliseum in Hampton, VA on November 21–22, 1997 and Lawrence Joel Veterans Memorial Coliseum, Winston-Salem, NC on November 23, 1997, in the midst of Phish's 1997 Fall "Phish Destroys America" Tour.

In addition to being a CD release, this box is available as a download in FLAC and MP3 formats at LivePhish.com. The CD format is currently out of print.

Track listing

Disc one
November 21, 1997 – first set:
"Emotional Rescue" (Jagger, Richards) - 17:45 →
"Split Open and Melt" (Anastasio) - 13:44
"Beauty of My Dreams" (McCoury) - 3:27
"Dogs Stole Things" (Anastasio, Marshall) - 4:48
"Punch You in the Eye" (Anastasio) - 9:13 →
"Lawn Boy" (Anastasio, Marshall) - 3:45 →
"Chalk Dust Torture" (Anastasio, Marshall) - 9:16
"Prince Caspian" (Anastasio, Marshall) - 10:20

Disc two
November 21, 1997 – second set:
"Ghost" (Anastasio, Marshall) - 15:57 →
"AC/DC Bag" (Anastasio) - 25:41 →
"Slave to the Traffic Light" (Abrahams, Anastasio, Pollak) - 12:32
"Loving Cup" (Jagger, Richards) - 7:39
November 21, 1997 – encore:
"Guyute" (Anastasio, Marshall) - 11:22

Disc three
November 22, 1997 – first set:
"Mike's Song" (Gordon) - 17:04 →
"I Am Hydrogen" (Anastasio, Daubert, Marshall) - 4:31 →
"Weekapaug Groove" (Anastasio, Fishman, Gordon, McConnell) - 14:52
"Harry Hood" (Anastasio, Fishman, Gordon, Long, McConnell) - 18:05 →
"Train Song" (Gordon, Linitz) - 3:06
"Billy Breathes" (Anastasio) - 7:05
"Frankenstein" (Winter) - 4:47 →
"Izabella" (Hendrix) - 5:50

Disc four
November 22, 1997 – second set:
"Halley's Comet" (Wright) - 26:00
"Tweezer" (Anastasio, Fishman, Gordon, McConnell) - 11:43 →
"Black-Eyed Katy" (Anastasio, Fishman, Gordon, McConnell) - 6:56 →
"Piper" (Anastasio, Marshall) - 7:53 →
"Run Like an Antelope" (Anastasio, Marshall, Pollak) - 13:38
November 22, 1997 – encore:
"Bouncing Around the Room" (Anastasio, Marshall) - 3:52 →
"Tweezer Reprise" (Anastasio, Fishman, Gordon, McConnell) - 4:06

Disc five
November 23, 1997 – first set:
"My Soul" (Chenier) - 7:23
"Theme from the Bottom" (Anastasio, Fishman, Gordon, Marshall, McConnell) - 10:22 →
"Black-Eyed Katy" (Anastasio, Fishman, Gordon, McConnell) - 10:55
"Sparkle" (Anastasio, Marshall) - 4:02
"Twist" (Anastasio, Marshall) - 10:21
"Stash" (Anastasio, Marshall) - 17:03 →
"NICU" (Anastasio, Marshall) - 5:50

Disc six
November 23, 1997 – first set, continued:
"Fluffhead" (Anastasio, Pollak) - 15:43 →
"Character Zero" (Anastasio, Marshall) - 7:22
November 23, 1997 – second set:
"Bathtub Gin" (Anastasio, Goodman) - 31:43 →
"Down with Disease" (Anastasio, Marshall) - 11:49 →
"Low Rider" (Allen, Brown, Dickerson, Jordan, Miller, Oskar, Scott) - 7:42 →
"Down with Disease" (Anastasio, Marshall) - 3:43

Disc seven
November 23, 1997 – second set, continued:
"Bold as Love" (Hendrix) - 8:03
November 23, 1997 – encore:
"Julius" (Anastasio, Marshall) - 11:06
November 21, 1997 – soundcheck:
"Hampton '97 Soundcheck Jam" (Anastasio, Fishman, Gordon, McConnell) - 17:45
November 23, 1997 – soundcheck:
"Back at the Chicken Shack" (Smith) - 10:32

"Weekapaug Groove" is misspelled as "Weekapaugh Groove" on this album.

Personnel
Phish
 Trey Anastasio - lead vocals, guitars
 Page McConnell - keyboards, lead vocals on "Lawn Boy" and "Bold As Love"
 Mike Gordon - bass guitar, lead vocals on "Emotional Rescue", "Mike's Song", and "Train Song"
 Jon Fishman - drums, vocals

Production credits

Audio recorded by Paul Languedoc
Mastered by Fred Kevorkian
Post-production by Kevin Shapiro
Design by Dan Black at LandLand!
Art direction by Julia Mordaunt
Management by Coran Capshaw for Red Light Management with Jason Colton and Patrick Jordan
1997 Management by John Paluska for Dionysian Productions with Shelly Culbertson, Jason Colton, Beth Montuori Rowles, and Karen Linehan

Jammy Award winners
LivePhish.com Downloads
Phish live albums
2011 live albums